The United States has maintained a consular presence in New Zealand since 1838. The first consul was James Reddy Clendon. Born in England, Clendon was a ship owner and merchant who bought land and settled in the Bay of Islands, New Zealand. In 1838 he was appointed by the federal government of the United States as consul for New Zealand. He was based at his property at Okiato, which in 1840 became the capital and was renamed Russell (not to be confused with present-day Russell). He held this position until 1841.

On July 16, 2021 President Joe Biden nominated former Senator Tom Udall to serve as United States Ambassador to New Zealand and Samoa. He was confirmed by the Senate on October 26, 2021 and the start of his tenure began on December 2, 2021.

The Ambassador to New Zealand is also accredited to Samoa though resident in Wellington.

List of United States ambassadors to New Zealand

See also
Embassy of the United States, Wellington
New Zealand - United States relations
Samoa - United States relations
Foreign relations of New Zealand
Foreign relations of Samoa
Ambassadors of the United States
Contents of the United States diplomatic cables leak (New Zealand)

References

United States Department of State: Background notes on New Zealand
United States Department of State: Background notes on Samoa

External links
 United States Department of State: Chiefs of Mission for New Zealand
 United States Department of State: Chiefs of Mission for Samoa
 United States Department of State: New Zealand
 United States Department of State: Samoa
 United States Embassy in Wellington

United States
New Zealand
Main
United States